Tau Tauri, Latinized from τ Tauri, is a quadruple star system in the constellation Taurus. It is visible to the naked eye as a faint point of light with a combined apparent visual magnitude of 4.33. The distance to this system is approximately about 400 light years based on parallax. The system is moving further from the Earth with a heliocentric radial velocity of +14.6 km/s, and it is a member of the Taurion OB association, located between Orion and Taurus. It is located 0.7 degree north of the ecliptic, and thus is subject to lunar occultations.

The blue-white hued primary, component Aa, is a B-type main-sequence star with a stellar classification of B3V. It was found to be a close spectroscopic binary in 1903 by American astronomers Edwin B. Frost and Walter S. Adams. The pair have an orbital period of 2.96 days and eccentricity of 0.05. A second companion, white-hued component Ab, has magnitude 6.97 and angular separation 0.2" from the primary in a 58-year orbit. This is a probably A-type main-sequence star with a class of A0V–A2V. The more distant component B is a type A1V star with magnitude 7.2 and separation 62.8".

References

B-type main-sequence stars
A-type main-sequence stars
Spectroscopic binaries
4

Taurus (constellation)
Tauri, Tau
BD+22 739
Tauri, 094
029763
021881
1497